Christopher Butler (born February 16, 1988 in Hilton Head Island, South Carolina) is an American former professional cyclist, who rode professionally between 2010 and 2017 for six different teams. After retiring from cycling, Butler became a mortgage broker in South Carolina.

Major results

2012
 5th Overall Tour of Japan
 7th Overall Tour of Hainan
2013
 10th Overall Tour de Beauce
2015
 3rd Overall Vuelta a la Independencia Nacional
2016
 1st Overall Tour of Arad
1st Stage 3
 1st Mount Evans Hill Climb
 Tour de Hongrie
1st  Mountains classification
1st Stage 4
 8th Overall Flèche du Sud
2017
 8th Overall Tour of Utah

Grand Tour general classification results timeline

References

External links

1988 births
Living people
American male cyclists
People from Hilton Head, South Carolina
21st-century American people